The 2022 Motorcycle Grand Prix of the Americas (officially known as the Red Bull Grand Prix of the Americas) was the fourth round of the 2022 Grand Prix motorcycle racing season. It was held at the Circuit of the Americas in Austin on April 10, 2022.

Background

Riders' entries 
In MotoGP class, Marc Márquez is back on track after missing the Argentine GP due to the case of diplopia, thanks to the OK received from the doctors. In the Moto2 class, Keminth Kubo is forced to miss the weekend of the Grand Prix due to the denied visa he was denied for this event in the United States. Barry Baltus returns after missing the previous Grand Prix due to a broken right wrist he suffered during qualifying for the Indonesian Grand Prix. In the Moto3 class, Gerard Riu continues to replace David Muñoz on the KTM of the Boé SKX team. David Salvador replaces John McPhee driving the Husqvarna of the Sterilgarda Husqvarna Max team.

MotoGP Championship standings before the race 
Thanks to his first career victory in the Argentine GP, Aleix Espargaró takes the top spot (for the first time in his career) with 45 points, 7 more than Brad Binder 9 from Enea Bastianini and Álex Rins and 10 from Fabio Quartararo. In the constructors' championship standings, Ducati overtakes the KTM again (61 vs. 55 points). Aprilia is third with 45 points, followed by Suzuki at 37 points, 2 more than Yamaha; Honda closes the standings with 24 points. In the team championship standings, Team Suzuki Ecstar is the new leader with 69 points, followed by Red Bull KTM Factory Racing with 3 points behind. Followed by Aprilia Racing with 58 points, Monster Energy Yamaha MotoGP with 49 points and Pramac Racing with 44 points.

Moto2 Championship standings before the race 
Celestino Vietti, winner of the previous Grand Prix, confirms himself as leader of the drivers' standings with 70 points and increases his advantage over his rivals: plus 21 points over Arón Canet, plus 25 over Somkiat Chantra, plus 34 over Ai Ogura and more than 35 over Sam Lowes. In the constructors' championship standings, led by Kalex with full points with 75 points, with Boscoscuro still at 10 points, it is worth mentioning the entry into the standings of the MV Agusta, with 1 point conquered with fifteenth place in Argentina by Marcos Ramírez. In the team championship standings, Idemitsu Honda Team Asia tops the standings with 81 points, followed by Mooney VR46 Racing Team, Elf Marc VDS Racing Team and Flexbox HP40 at 11, 17 and 20 points respectively. Red Bull KTM Ajo is fifth with 44 points.

Moto3 Championship standings before the race 
Sergio García beats Dennis Foggia in the Argentine Grand Prix and overtakes him in the drivers' championship standings (58 points for the former, 54 points for the latter). The two have a wide advantage over their rivals: Izan Guevara, Kaito Toba and Deniz Öncü follow, sandwiched between them in two points (28, 27 and 26 points respectively). In the constructors' championship standings, Honda leads with 70 points, with a 5-point lead over Gas Gas. KTM is third with 37 points, 7 more than CFMoto and 10 more than Husqvarna. The team championship standings see Solunion GasGas Aspar Team confirmed at the top of the standings with 86 points, with Leopard Racing second 15 points behind. Third is CFMoto Racing Prüstel GP with 40 points, followed by MT Helmets - MSI (36 points) and CIP Green Power (34 points).

Free practice

MotoGP

Combined Free Practice 1-2-3 
The top ten riders (written in bold) qualified in Q2.

Personal Best lap

Qualifying

MotoGP

Moto2

Moto3

Race

MotoGP

Moto2

Moto3

 Alberto Surra was declared unfit for Sunday's race after a heavy crash in FP3 on Saturday morning.

Championship standings after the race
Below are the standings for the top five riders, constructors, and teams after the round.

MotoGP

Riders' Championship standings

Constructors' Championship standings

Teams' Championship standings

Moto2

Riders' Championship standings

Constructors' Championship standings

Teams' Championship standings

Moto3

Riders' Championship standings

Constructors' Championship standings

Teams' Championship standings

References

External links 

Americas
2022 in American motorsport
2022
April 2022 sports events in the United States